Planaltinella is a genus of moths belonging to the family Tortricidae.

Species
Planaltinella bahia Razowski & Becker, 2002
Planaltinella chapadana Razowski & Becker, 2007
Planaltinella psephena Razowski & Becker, 2007
Planaltinella rhatyma Razowski & Becker, 1994

See also
List of Tortricidae genera

References

 , 1994, SHILAP revta. lepid. 22: 33
 , 2011: Diagnoses and remarks on genera of Tortricidae, 2: Cochylini (Lepidoptera: Tortricidae). Shilap Revista de Lepidopterologia 39 (156): 397–414.
 ,2005 World Catalogue of Insects, 5
 , 2002: Systematic and faunistic data on Neotropical Cochylini (Lepidoptera: Tortricidae), with descriptions of new species. Part.1. Acta zool. cracov. 45: 287-316

External links
tortricidae.com

Cochylini
Tortricidae genera